Timo Rautiainen (born 13 November 1964) is a Finnish former rally co-driver. He is best known for co-driving for Marcus Grönholm from 1995 to 2007. Rautiainen and Grönholm drove for Peugeot (2000–05) and Ford (2006-07) in the World Rally Championship, and won 30 world rallies and two drivers' world championship titles together. Rautiainen is married to Grönholm's sister.

References

External links
Profile at ewrc-results.com

1964 births
Living people
Finnish rally co-drivers
World Rally Championship co-drivers
Sportspeople from Espoo